The Portrait of Bindo Altoviti is a painting finished around 1515 by the Italian High Renaissance painter Raphael. It is housed in the National Gallery of Art of Washington, D.C., United States.

Bindo Altoviti was a rich banker born in Rome in 1491 of Florentine origin. He was a cultured man who liked the arts. 

The graceful, almost effeminate position of the subject along with the heavy contrast between light and shadow are atypical of Raphael's work, particularly of his portraits of men, demonstrating the artist's experimentation with different styles and forms in his later Roman period.  The influence of the works of Leonardo, which Raphael studied astutely during this period of his career, is strikingly evident in this particular piece.

The painting was a property of Altoviti's descendants until 1808, when it was sold to Ludwig I of Bavaria. It remained at the Alte Pinakothek until 1936, when, after many debates about its attribution, the painting was lured out of Nazi Germany by "canny English dealers". Acquired by Samuel Henry Kress, the portrait subsequently became property of the National Gallery of Art in Washington, D.C..

A bronze bust of Altoviti by Benvenuto Cellini is exhibited in Boston at the Isabella Stewart Gardner Museum.

See also
List of paintings by Raphael

References

Further reading 
David Brown and Jane Van Nimmen. Raphael and the Beautiful Banker: The Story of the Bindo Altoviti Portrait. Yale University Press, 2005.

External links 

 Catalogue record for the painting at National Gallery of Art

1515 paintings
Bindo
Collections of the National Gallery of Art
Bindo